Eyatne Rizo Gómez (born 18 October 1995) is a Cuban handball player for Fleury Loiret HB and the Cuban national team.

She competed at the 2015 World Women's Handball Championship in Denmark.

Awards and achievements
 2015 Pan American Women's Handball Championship: All Star Team Playmaker

References

External links

1995 births
Living people
Cuban female handball players
Sportspeople from Havana
Handball players at the 2015 Pan American Games
Handball players at the 2019 Pan American Games
Pan American Games medalists in handball
Pan American Games bronze medalists for Cuba
Central American and Caribbean Games bronze medalists for Cuba
Competitors at the 2018 Central American and Caribbean Games
Expatriate handball players
Central American and Caribbean Games medalists in handball
Cuban expatriate sportspeople in France

Medalists at the 2019 Pan American Games
21st-century Cuban women